Zibreira is a civil parish in Portugal, located within the municipality of Torres Novas, in the Santarém District. It is noted for the Aroeria cave, where the Aroeira 3 skull of a 400,000 year old Homo Heidelbergensis was found, being the oldest trace of human history in Portugal.

As of 2011, there are 1,028 inhabitants living within the  parish, giving it a population density of around 98 people per sq kilometer (254 people per sq mile)

Location
Zibreira sits near the junction of the A1 (North Motorway) which connects Lisbon, the capital, to Porto; and the A23 motorway (Portugal) (Auto-Estrada da Beira Interior) which connects to Guarda and Spain. This location has greatly aided its industrialization.

Archaeology
The village of Almonda, within the parish of Zibreira, is noted for the Aroeira cave, where the 400,000 year old Aroeira 3 skull of a Homo Heidelbergensis was discovered in 2014. It is the oldest trace of human history in Portugal.

Economy
Renova, (Fábrica de Papel do Almonda, SA), an international paper company, and Companhia de Torres Novas, a textiles company, are both based within the municipality.

References

Archaeological sites in Santarém District
Villages in Portugal
Populated places in Santarém District
Municipalities of Santarém District